Odites malagasiella is a moth in the family Depressariidae. It was described by Pierre Viette in 1967. It is found in Madagascar.

References

Moths described in 1967
Odites
Taxa named by Edward Meyrick